Van Cortlandt Manor is a 17th-century house and property built by the van Cortland family located near the confluence of the Croton and Hudson Rivers in the village of Croton-on-Hudson in Westchester County, New York, United States. The colonial era stone and brick manor house is now a museum and is a National Historic Landmark.

History
By Royal Charter, Van Cortlandt Manor was originally a  tract granted as a Patent to Stephanus Van Cortlandt in 1697 by King William III, stretching from the Hudson River on the west to the first boundary line between the Province of New York and the Colony of Connecticut, on the east, twenty English miles in width by ten in height, in shape nearly a rectangular parallelogram, forming, "The Manor of Cortlandt." The massive holding was acquired by direct purchase from the Indians, in part, by Stephanus van Cortlandt, a native born Dutch gentleman of New York, and in part by others whose titles he subsequently bought, this tract, together with a small tract on the west side of the Hudson River opposite the promontory of Anthony's Nose, which he also purchased from the Indians.

The Manor House was built sometime before 1732 but was not any owner's principal residence until a grandson, Pierre Van Cortlandt, moved there in 1749.  At that time the manor house was on a  portion of the original tract.

Pierre brought his family to the estate in 1749 and created the manor's most vibrant days, according to some.  He established a self-sustaining community  of an apple orchard, dairy farm, bee house, kiln, tavern, and carpenter and blacksmith shops.

At this time, though, tensions leading to the Revolutionary War were building and the manor would become a place of wartime retreat. Pierre sided with the colonies and the manor was used to assist the Continental Army, using its resources to make food and supplies.  Pierre was involved with military legislature, and his son Philip was a soldier for the Continental Army.  Eventually Pierre and his family vacated the manor in the thick of the war.  The manor was ransacked by the British Army and left in poor standing. Philip, becoming a brigadier general by the war's end, returned and, along with his sister, Catherine, brought the manor back to working order.

Van Cortlandt Manor became an essential stop on the route from New York to Albany in the years that followed the war. The mills were once again thriving and provided the community and travelers with food, supplies, and lodging.  Pierre and his wife did not return until 1803 once the manor was in full working order again.  
The manor was passed down in the family until it was sold to a non-relative, Otis Taylor, in 1945.  By this time the property had lost luster, and was not the flourishing estate it had once been.  Some buildings and barn houses were taken down to accommodate for more modern facilities, such as a drive-in movie theater.

In 1953 John D. Rockefeller Jr. purchased the property and began restoring the manor to previous prominence.  In 1961, Van Cortlandt Manor became registered as a National Historic Landmark.

The house is not included in the area of the hamlet of Cortlandt Manor, New York. It is one of the historic sites owned and operated by Historic Hudson Valley.

See also
List of National Historic Landmarks in New York
National Register of Historic Places listings in northern Westchester County, New York

References

External links 
 Official Site.

Houses on the National Register of Historic Places in New York (state)
National Register of Historic Places in Westchester County, New York
National Historic Landmarks in New York (state)
Historic house museums in Westchester County, New York
Stagecoach stops in the United States